Avi Schönfeld is a Polish pianist and composer. He was born in Lodz, Poland on 15 December 1947.

Life
Schönfeld gave his first concert in his native Poland at the age of 19 before going to Israel to become a pupil of the Bartók disciple Ilona Vincze-Kraus. After winning several national and international prizes, including one with the Jerusalem Symphony Orchestra and first prize in the Leo Kestenberg competition, Schönfeld made his debut with the Israeli Radio and Television Orchestra playing Rachmaninov's Paganini Variations.

In November 1972, at the invitation of the French government, Schönfeld undertook study with Vlado Perlemuter, Yvonne Lefébure, Arthur Rubinstein, and Marcel Ciampi in piano, Henryk Szeryng in chamber music, and Nadia Boulanger and Alexandre Tansman in composition. After a period of teaching at the Royal Brussels Conservatory, Schönfeld was appointed to a post at the Maastricht Conservatory in the Netherlands, where he still teaches.

In addition to his creative work, Schönfeld is artistic director and founder of the European Pianistic Research Institute of Maastricht (EPRIM) and artistic adviser to the Anglo Dutch Piano Platform and the Académie Pianistica of the Maastricht Municipal Theatre. He receives commissions for writing the compositions for piano competitions and serves as a jury member in said competitions.

Compositions
Among Schönfeld's compositions for piano are Animato, Sphinx, Labyrinthe, Ombres and Tango-Etude (all published by Max Eschig/Durand), Agitato and Jeu (Henry Lemoine), Légende (Editions Combre), and Sonatine Mediterranean.  He has written five piano sonatas (nr. 3: Notturno, nr. 4: Hommage a Chopin, nr. 5: C minor). Among his chamber works are a violin sonata and a Ballade for violin and piano, a cello sonata, a clarinet sonata, a suite for two pianos, and an almost finished piano concerto.

References
 http://www.cervantesvirtual.com/servlet/SirveObras/albnz/06927392599603895332268/AR-EDI-0000-00055-02.pdf
 https://web.archive.org/web/20100225064240/http://www.left-hand-brofeldt.dk/Catalogue_s.htm
 http://www.editionhh.co.uk/ab_as.htm
 Concert program of Schönfeld's London debut with biography.

External links
 

1947 births
Living people
Dutch classical pianists
Israeli classical pianists
Polish classical pianists
Polish emigrants to Israel
Academic staff of the Maastricht Academy of Music
Musicians from Łódź
21st-century classical pianists